Anti-bullying may refer to:

Anti-bullying legislation, with the intent of reducing bullying against students
Anti-Bullying Day or Pink Shirt day, celebrated on various dates across the world
Anti-Bullying Week, an annual British event

See also
Bullying